Gabrielle Dorziat (25 January 1880 – 30 November 1979) was a French stage and film actress.  Dorziat was a fashion trend setter in Paris and helped popularize the designs of Coco Chanel.  The Théâtre Gabrielle-Dorziat in Épernay, France is named for her.

Biography
She was born in 1880. Dorziat made her stage début in 1898 at the Théâtre Royal du Parc in Brussels.  She moved to Paris and appeared in Alfred Capus' La Bourse ou la vie (1900), but it was her performance as Thérèse Herbault in Chaîne anglaise (1906) that brought her to public attention.  She became known for her off-stage life as well, becoming romantically involved with actors Lucien Guitry and Louis Jouvet.  She had close friendships with Jean Cocteau, Jean Giraudoux, Coco Chanel, Paul Bourget and Henri Bernstein.  During World War I Dorziat left France to tour the United States where she raised money for war refugees.  After the war she toured Canada, South America and the rest of Europe.

In 1921 Dorziat appeared in her first film L'Infante à la rose.  She went on to play in over sixty films including Mayerling, Les Parents terribles and Manon. In 1925, she married Count Michel de Zogheb, a friend of King Fuad I of Egypt.  She published her memoirs Côté cour, côté jardin in 1968.

She died in 1979.

Partial filmography

 L'Infante à la rose (1923) - Olive de Romanin
 Mayerling (1936) - L'impératrice Élisabeth
 Samson (1936) - La Marquise d'Andeline
 Forty Little Mothers (1936) - Mme Granval, La directrice
 Southern Mail (1937) - La mère
 L'amour veille (1937) - Madame de Juvigny
 Woman of Malacca (1937) - Lady Patricia Brandmore
 The Lie of Nina Petrovna (1937) - Baroness Engern
 Êtes-vous jalouse? (1938) - Gabrielle Brunois
 Mollenard (1938) - Mme. Mollenard
 Monsieur Breloque a disparu (1938) - La baronne Granger
 Le drame de Shanghaï (1938) - La directrice du collège
 Mother Love (1938) - Adrienne
 The Foolish Virgin (1938) - La mère de Gisèle
 Behind the Facade (1939) - Madame Bernier
 The End of the Day (1939) - Madame Chabert
 The Man Who Seeks the Truth (1940) - Adrienne
 Sarajevo (1940) - L'archiduchesse Marie-Thérèse (et)
 Premier rendez-vous (1941) - La directrice de l'orphelinat
 Le journal tombe à cinq heures (1942) - Mademoiselle Lebeau
 Soyez les bienvenus (1942) - Madame Boisleroi
 L'appel du bled (1942) - Madame Darbois
 Patricia (1942) - Mademoiselle Pressac - Tante Laurie
 The Wolf of the Malveneurs (1943) - Magda
 Strange Inheritance (1943) - Gérardine Éloi
 The Phantom Baron (1943) - La comtesse de Saint-Helie
 Échec au roy (1945) - Madame de Maintenon
 Paris Frills (1945) - Solange
 The French Way (1945) - Madame Ancelot
 L'ange qu'on m'a donné (1946) - La comtesse de Cébrat
 Goodbye Darling (1946) - Constance
 Désarroi (1947) - Madame Meillan
 Miroir (1947) - Madame Puc
 Monsieur Vincent (1947) - La présidente Groussault
 Ruy Blas (1948) - La duchesse d'Albuquerque
 Une grande fille toute simple (1948) - Tante Edmée
 Les Parents terribles (1948) - Tante Léo
 Manon (1949) - Mme Agnès
 Tomorrow Is Too Late (1950) - La direttrice
 Ballerina (1950) - Aunt
 Born of Unknown Father (1950) - Mme. Mussot
 La Vérité sur Bébé Donge (1952) - Madame D'Ortemont
 So Little Time (1952) - Madame de Malvines
 Judgement of God (1952) - La margrave Josépha
 Son of the Hunchback (1952) - Contessa Lagardere
 Little Boy Lost (1953) - Mother Superior
 Traviata '53 (1953) - Signora Zoe
 Act of Love (1953, aka Un acte d'amour) - Adèle Lacaud
 Madame du Barry (1954) - La Gourdan
 Le fil à la patte (1954) - La baronne Du Verger - la mère de Viviane
 The Two Orphans (1954) - La Frochard
 Nagana (1955) - Mme Larguillière
 Pity for the Vamps (1956) - Éléonore Davis
 Mitsou (1956) - La baronne
 Les Espions (1957) - Madame Andrée - l'infirmière
 Resurrection (1958) - Kitajewa
 Polikuschka (1958) - Herrin
 Drôles de phénomènes (1959) - Madame Marcevault
 Magnificent Sinner (1959) - La directrice de l'institute Smolny
 Climats (1962) - Mme Cheverny, la mère d'Isabelle
 Un singe en hiver (1962) - Victoria
 Gigot (1962) - Madame Brigitte
 Germinal (1963) - La grand-mère de Catherine
 Monsieur (1964) - La belle-mère
 Cyrano and d'Artagnan (1964) - Françoise de Mauvières
 Thomas the Impostor (1965) - La cartomancienne
 Un mari à prix fixe (1965) - Mme Reinhoff, mère

Theatre
 Chaîne anglaise by Camille Oudinot and Abel Hermant, Théâtre du Vaudeville (1906)
 Les Jacobines by Abel Hermant, Théâtre du Vaudeville (1907)
 Chérubin by Francis de Croisset, Théâtre Fémina (1908)
 La Sonate à Kreutzer by Fernand Nozière and Alfred Savoir (1910)
 Bel Ami (1912)
 Les Éclaireuses by Maurice Donnay, Comédie Marigny (1913)
 L'Épervier by Francis de Croisset, Théâtre de l'Ambigu (1914)
 Comédienne by Jacques Bousquet, Paul Armont, Théâtre des Nouveautés (1921)
 Trois et une by Denys Amiel, Théâtre Saint-Georges (1932)
 Espoir by Henry Bernstein, Théâtre du Gymnase, with  Claude Dauphin, Victor Francen and Renée Devillers, (1934)
  La vie est si courte by Léopold Marchand, Théâtre Pigalle (1936)
 Électre by Jean Giraudoux, Théâtre de l'Athénée (1937)
 Les Parents terribles by Jean Cocteau, Théâtre des Ambassadeurs (1938)
 La Machine à écrire by Jean Cocteau (1941)
 Le Dîner de famille by Jean Bernard-Luc, Théâtre de la Michodière (1944)

References

External links

1880 births
1979 deaths
French film actresses
French stage actresses
French countesses
French women in World War I
20th-century French actresses
People from Épernay
Officiers of the Légion d'honneur